Penalty methods are a certain class of algorithms for solving constrained optimization problems. 

A penalty method replaces a constrained optimization problem by a series of unconstrained problems whose solutions ideally converge to the solution of the original constrained problem.  The unconstrained problems are formed by adding a term, called a penalty function, to the objective function that consists of a penalty parameter multiplied by a measure of violation of the constraints.  The measure of violation is nonzero when the constraints are violated and is zero in the region where constraints are not violated.

Example 

Let us say we are solving the following constrained problem:

subject to

This problem can be solved as a series of unconstrained minimization problems

where  

In the above equations,  is the exterior penalty function while  are the penalty coefficients. In each iteration k of the method, we increase the penalty coefficient  (e.g. by a factor of 10), solve the unconstrained problem and use the solution as the initial guess for the next iteration. Solutions of the successive unconstrained problems will asymptotically converge to the solution of the original constrained problem.

Practical application 

Image compression optimization algorithms can make use of penalty functions for selecting how best to compress zones of colour to single representative values.

Barrier methods 

Barrier methods constitute an alternative class of algorithms for constrained optimization.  These methods also add a penalty-like term to the objective function, but in this case the iterates are forced to remain interior to the feasible domain and the barrier is in place to bias the iterates to remain away from the boundary of the feasible region.

See also 

Other nonlinear programming algorithms:

 Sequential quadratic programming
 Successive linear programming
 Sequential linear-quadratic programming
 Interior point method
 Augmented Lagrangian method

Other links:

 Barrier function

References

Smith, Alice E.; Coit David W. Penalty functions Handbook of Evolutionary Computation, Section C 5.2. Oxford University Press and Institute of Physics Publishing, 1996.

Courant, R. Variational methods for the solution of problems of equilibrium and vibrations. Bull. Amer. Math. Soc., 49, 1–23, 1943.

Wotao, Y. Optimization Algorithms for constrained optimization. Department of Mathematics, UCLA, 2015.

Optimization algorithms and methods